Westhouse is a commune in the Bas-Rhin department in Alsace in north-eastern France.

Population

See also
 Communes of the Bas-Rhin department

References

External links

Westhouse.info

Communes of Bas-Rhin